Phillipe J. Nover (born February 3, 1984), is a retired American mixed martial artist. He is best known for making it to the finals of The Ultimate Fighter: Team Nogueira vs. Team Mir. He is a former Ring of Combat lightweight champion.

Early life and career
Nover was born and raised in Brooklyn. He trained with Sifu Ralph Mitchell at Universal Defense Systems which covers Filipino Arnis (similar to Filipino Kali/Eskrima), Yaw-Yan, Muay Thai, Savate, Kickboxing, Judo, Kung Fu and Jeet Kune Do. He began training in martial arts at age ten and attended The Leon M. Goldstein High School for the Sciences.

He attended Kingsborough Community College and works in a Brooklyn hospital as a registered nurse. Phillipe completed his bachelor's degree at SUNY Downstate Medical Center.  Nover holds a black belt in Brazilian Jiu-Jitsu under Alexander "Soca" Freitas. Nover trains at Renzo Gracie Academy in New York City, Edge Wrestling in New Jersey, and Church Street Boxing gym in Tribeca New York under his striking trainer Jason Strout.

The Ultimate Fighter

Nover normally fought as a welterweight but since The Ultimate Fighter: Team Nogueira vs. Team Mir only had an opening for lightweights and light-heavyweights he had to cut weight to be able to participate. Dana White called him "Fainting Phillipe" because he had fainted when White was announcing the coaches. In the preliminary round, Nover defeated Joe Duarte with a rear naked choke in the second round. In episode 8, Nover defeated Dave Kaplan, again via rear naked choke then proclaimed himself as the toughest registered nurse on the planet. In the same episode Dana White mentioned that Nover reminds him of a young Georges St-Pierre. Nover defeated George Roop in the semi-finals via a kimura lock but ultimately lost in the Ultimate Fighter Finale on December 13, 2008, to Efrain Escudero via unanimous decision.

Ultimate Fighting Championship

Phillipe Nover fought Kyle Bradley at UFC 98, losing via a controversial TKO at 1:03 of the first round. After taking down Nover, Bradley landed some heavy punches on his prone opponent. Nover was pulling guard ready to defend, however Referee Yves Lavigne stopped the fight. Lavigne was booed by the crowd for the remainder of the event.

Phillipe Nover was set to fight Sam Stout at UFC Fight Night 19, replacing the injured Kyle Bradley. On September 16, 2009, the day of the fight, Nover had fainted. As a result, the match with Stout was cancelled.

Nover then faced a fellow Ultimate Fighter alumni Rob Emerson at UFC 109 on February 6, 2010. Nover lost a controversial unanimous decision.  Sherdog.com scored the bout 29–28 in favor of Nover.  With a UFC record of 0–3, he was released from the promotion.

Post-UFC
After being released from the UFC, Nover continued to train MMA in New York and teach at a local mixed martial arts school. Nover took a year off from competing to focus on his coaching and nursing careers. He had a few Muay Thai matches before returning to compete in MMA. He returned to the cage after an 18-month layoff to meet Jake Murphy, a Greg Jackson-trained fighter, at Hoosier Fight Club 8 on August 20, 2011. He replaced the last man to defeat him, Murphy's original opponent, Rob Emerson, who had to pull out of the fight due to injury. Nover won the fight by unanimous decision, 29–28 on all three judges' scorecards.

Bellator Fighting Championships
A few weeks after his win over Murphy, Nover was signed to fight in Bellator Fighting Championships. His debut came at Bellator 59 against Polish submission ace, Marcin Held. Nover lost the fight via a controversial split decision. During the bout, Nover was able to dominate on the stand-up and maintain top position on the ground as well as display strong submission defense. However, two of the three judges scored for Held's multiple submission attempts. Sherdog.com scored the bout 29–28 in favor of Nover.

Nover faced Derrick Kennington on September 28, 2012, at Bellator 74.  He won the fight via submission in the second round.  In his third fight for the promotion, Nover faced Darrell Horcher at Bellator 95 on April 4, 2013.  He won the fight via unanimous decision.

Return to UFC
After five years away from the organization, Nover made his return to the UFC when he faced Yui Chul Nam in a featherweight bout on May 16, 2015, at UFC Fight Night: Edgar vs. Faber. He won the fight via split decision.

Nover next faced Zubaira Tukhugov on December 10, 2015, at UFC Fight Night 80. He lost the fight via split decision.

Nover faced Renan Barão on September 24, 2016, at UFC Fight Night 95. He lost the fight via unanimous decision.

Nover faced Ricky Glenn on February 11, 2017, at UFC 208. He lost the back-and-forth fight via split decision.

On February 15, 2017, Nover announced his retirement from mixed martial arts.

Brazilian Jiu-jitsu
Before his fight with Efrain Escudero, Phillipe was awarded a black belt in Brazilian Jiu-Jitsu by Alexandre "Soca" Freitas on Dec. 6, 2008. The ceremony took place at the Soca Brazilian Jiu-Jitsu Academy in New York. Phillipe has been studying BJJ since he was 17 years old.  Nover faced his Ultimate Fighter Season 8 finale opponent Escudero in a submission-only match on November 9, 2013, at the World Jiu-Jitsu Expo; they fought to a draw.  In his next match-up, a wrestling match at Grapple at the Garden on December 1, 2013, he was defeated by former UFC lightweight champion Frankie Edgar.

Nover announced that he became a third degree black belt in January 2020.

Instructor lineage
Mitsuyo "Count Koma" Maeda → Carlos Gracie, Sr. → Helio Gracie → Carlos Gracie Jr. → Alexandre Freitas → Phillipe Nover

Retirement
Nover is a cardiac nurse in Brooklyn.

Championships and Accomplishments
Ring of Combat
ROC Lightweight Championship (One time, Vacated)

Mixed martial arts record

|-
|Loss
|align=center|
|Ricky Glenn
| Decision (split)
|UFC 208
|
|align=center| 3
|align=center| 5:00
|Brooklyn, New York, United States
| 
|-
|Loss
|align=center|11–7–1 
|Renan Barão
| Decision (unanimous)
|UFC Fight Night: Cyborg vs. Länsberg
|
|align=center| 3
|align=center| 5:00
|Brasília, Brazil
|  
|-
|Loss
|align=center|11–6–1
|Zubaira Tukhugov
|Decision (split)
|UFC Fight Night: Namajunas vs. VanZant
|
|align=center|3
|align=center|5:00
|Las Vegas, Nevada, United States
|   
|-
|Win
|align=center| 11–5–1
|Yui Chul Nam
|Decision (split)
|UFC Fight Night: Edgar vs. Faber
|
|align=center|3
|align=center|5:00
|Pasay, Philippines
|
|-
|Win
|align=center|10–5–1
|Dan Cion 
|Submission (rear-naked choke)
|Ring of Combat 50
|
|align=center| 2
|align=center| 1:10
| Atlantic City, New Jersey, United States
|
|-
|Win
|align=center|9–5–1
|Mike Santiago
|Decision (unanimous)
|Ring of Combat 45
|
|align=center| 3
|align=center| 5:00
| Atlantic City, New Jersey, United States
|
|-
|Win
|align=center|8–5–1
|Darrell Horcher
|Decision (unanimous)
|Bellator 95
|
|align=center|3 
|align=center|5:00 
| Atlantic City, New Jersey, United States
|
|-
|Loss
|align=center|7–5–1
|Anthony Rocco Martin
|Decision (majority)
|Dakota FC 14
|
|align=center|3
|align=center|5:00
|Fargo, North Dakota, United States
|
|-
|Win
|align=center|7–4–1
|Derrick Kennington
|Submission (rear-naked choke)
|Bellator 74
|
|align=center| 2
|align=center| 4:20
|Atlantic City, New Jersey, United States
|
|-
|Loss
|align=center|6–4–1
|Marcin Held
|Decision (split)
|Bellator 59
|
|align=center|3
|align=center|5:00
|Atlantic City, New Jersey, United States
|
|-
|Win
|align=center|6–3–1
|Jake Murphy
|Decision (unanimous)
|Hoosier Fight Club 8
|
|align=center|3
|align=center|5:00
|Valparaiso, Indiana, United States
|
|-
|Loss
|align=center|5–3–1
|Rob Emerson
|Decision (unanimous)
|UFC 109
|
|align=center|3
|align=center|5:00
|Las Vegas, Nevada, United States
|
|-
|Loss
|align=center|5–2–1
|Kyle Bradley
|TKO (punches)
|UFC 98
|
|align=center|1
|align=center|1:03
|Las Vegas, Nevada, United States
|
|-
|Loss
|align=center|5–1–1
|Efrain Escudero
|Decision (unanimous)
|The Ultimate Fighter: Team Nogueira vs. Team Mir Finale
|
|align=center|3
|align=center|5:00
|Las Vegas, Nevada, United States
|
|-
|Win
|align=center|5–0–1
|Jay Coleman
|Submission (kimura)
|Ring of Combat 13
|
|align=center|1
|align=center|3:00
|Atlantic City, New Jersey, United States
|
|-
|Win
|align=center|4–0–1
|Abner Lloveras
|Decision (majority)
|Ring of Combat 12
|
|align=center|2
|align=center|5:00
|Atlantic City, New Jersey, United States
|
|-
|Win
|align=center|3–0–1
|Dave Drago
|Submission (rear-naked choke)
|Ring of Combat 11
|
|align=center|1
|align=center|1:58
|Atlantic City, New Jersey, United States
|
|-
|Win
|align=center|2–0–1
|Michael McQuade
|KO (punches)
|Ring of Combat 9
|
|align=center|1
|align=center|0:16
|Asbury Park, New Jersey, United States
|
|-
|Draw
|align=center|1–0–1
|Jason Dublin
|Draw
|CZ 7: Gravel Pit
|
|align=center|2
|align=center|5:00
|Revere, Massachusetts, United States
|
|-
|Win
|align=center|1–0
|Ron Stallings
|Submission (guillotine choke)
|RF 4: Reality Fighting 4
|
|align=center|1
|align=center|0:43
|Bayonne, New Jersey, United States
|

Exhibition record

|-
|Win
|align=center|3–0
|George Roop
|Submission (kimura)
|The Ultimate Fighter: Team Nogueira vs. Team Mir Episode-12
|
|align=center|1
|align=center|2:28
|Las Vegas, Nevada, United States
|
|-
|Win
|align=center|2–0
|Dave Kaplan
|Submission (rear-naked choke)
|The Ultimate Fighter: Team Nogueira vs. Team Mir Episode-8
|
|align=center|1
|align=center|1:58
|Las Vegas, Nevada, United States
|
|-
|Win
|align=center|1–0
|Joe Duarte 
|Submission (rear-naked choke)
|The Ultimate Fighter: Team Nogueira vs. Team Mir Episode-1
|
|align=center| 2
|align=center| 1:52
|Las Vegas, Nevada, United States
|

See also
 List of current UFC fighters
 List of male mixed martial artists

References

External links
Official Website
TUF Profile
 
 

1984 births
American male mixed martial artists
American mixed martial artists of Filipino descent
Sportspeople from Brooklyn
American nurses
American Muay Thai practitioners
American wushu practitioners
American savateurs
American practitioners of Brazilian jiu-jitsu
American Jeet Kune Do practitioners
American male judoka
Mixed martial artists utilizing Jeet Kune Do
Mixed martial artists utilizing wushu
Mixed martial artists utilizing Muay Thai
Mixed martial artists utilizing savate
Mixed martial artists utilizing Yaw-Yan
Mixed martial artists utilizing judo
Mixed martial artists utilizing Brazilian jiu-jitsu
Living people
Male nurses
Lightweight mixed martial artists
Featherweight mixed martial artists
SUNY Downstate Medical Center alumni
People awarded a black belt in Brazilian jiu-jitsu
Ultimate Fighting Championship male fighters